Kurt John Sorensen (born 8 November 1956) is a New Zealand former professional rugby league footballer who played in the 1970s, 1980s and 1990s.

Background
He is the brother of fellow Kiwi international, Dane Sorensen, and the nephew of another pair of Kiwi brothers, Bill and Dave Sorensen. He is of Tongan and Danish descent.

Playing career
While playing in the Auckland Rugby League competition, Sorensen made his début for the New Zealand national rugby league team in the 1975 World Cup. The following year, while playing for Mt Wellington, he won the Auckland Rugby League's Rothville Trophy, which is awarded to the Premier One player of the year as chosen by the Auckland Coach. Sorensen then moved to England to play for Wigan for the 1976–77 season. He later played for the Cronulla-Sutherland Sharks, finishing the 1982 season as the club's top try scorer.

While at Widnes, Sorensen played in 252 games and captained the side that won the Championship, the Premiership and the 1989 World Club Challenge. He also played in the Widnes side that lost the Challenge Cup. In 1986, after returning from the English season, Sorensen made some cameo appearances for the Northcote Tigers in the Auckland Rugby League competition. During the 1989–90 season, Sorensen captained defending champions Widnes at second-row forward in their 1989 World Club Challenge victory against the visiting Canberra Raiders. Kurt Sorensen played left- in Widnes' 24–18 victory over Salford in the 1990 Lancashire Cup Final during the 1990–91 season at Central Park, Wigan on Saturday 29 September 1990.

Kurt Sorensen played left- in Widnes' 6–12 defeat by Wigan in the 1988–89 John Player Special Trophy Final during the 1988–89 season at Burnden Park, Bolton on Saturday 7 January 1989, and played left-, and scored a try in the 24–0 victory over Leeds in the 1991–92 Regal Trophy Final during the 1991–92 season at Central Park, Wigan on Saturday 11 January 1992.

After leaving Widnes, Sorensen was the player-coach at Whitehaven before controversially joining rivals Workington Town in 1995. He resigned a year later before resuming his playing career with Chorley in England, and Cudgen on the Gold Coast.

Legacy
In 2000 Sorensen was inducted as one of the NZRL's Legends of League.

References

External links
 Wigan Playing Career Details
 Widnes Playing Career Details
 
 
 

1956 births
Living people
Auckland rugby league team players
Chorley Lynx players
Cronulla-Sutherland Sharks players
Mount Wellington Warriors players
New Zealand national rugby league team players
New Zealand expatriate sportspeople in England
New Zealand expatriate sportspeople in Australia
New Zealand people of Danish descent
New Zealand sportspeople of Tongan descent
New Zealand rugby league coaches
New Zealand rugby league players
Northcote Tigers players
Rugby league props
Rugby league second-rows
Sydney Roosters players
Whitehaven R.L.F.C. coaches
Whitehaven R.L.F.C. players
Widnes Vikings captains
Widnes Vikings players
Wigan Warriors players
Workington Town coaches